Tetraselago. is a genus of flowering plants belonging to the family Scrophulariaceae.

Its native range is KwaZulu-Natal, Northern Provinces and Eswatini.

Species:

Tetraselago longituba 
Tetraselago natalensis 
Tetraselago nelsonii 
Tetraselago wilmsii

References

Scrophulariaceae
Scrophulariaceae genera